Bright Leaf is a 1950 American Drama Western film directed by Michael Curtiz and starring Gary Cooper, Lauren Bacall and Patricia Neal. It is adapted from the 1949 novel of the same name by Foster Fitz-Simons. The title comes from the type of tobacco grown in North Carolina after the American Civil War. According to Bright Leaves, a 2003 documentary film by Ross McElwee, the plot is loosely based on the rivalry of tobacco tycoons Washington Duke and John Harvey McElwee, the filmmaker's great-grandfather.

Plot 
Brant Royle (Gary Cooper) returns to his hometown, (fictional) Kingsmont, North Carolina, to settle his uncle's estate. Many years before, powerful tobacco magnate and cigar-manufacturer Major Singleton (Donald Crisp) drove Brant and his father (now dead) out of town. Singleton foreclosed on the Royles because they grew the best bright leaf tobacco and because young Brant dared to fall in love with his daughter, Margaret (Patricia Neal).

When Royle stops a runaway carriage driven by Margaret, she gives him a cool reception. His ardor remains undiminished. Bored and eager for excitement, she deliberately incites her father to confront Royle at the hotel. Inventor John Barton (Jeff Corey) needing financing for his revolutionary cigarette-rolling machine, sees the incident and approaches Royle. (Singleton dismissed the idea.) Royle has $40, a run-down cigarette factory—and a friend.

Brant was Sonia Kovac's (Lauren Bacall) first love. Long ago, he gave her his father's chiming pocket watch. Once a cigarette girl, Sonia has prospered by turning her late mother's house into a high-class bordello. Royle persuades her to invest in the machine, making her a partner. "I don't kiss partners," Sonia says. Brant  hires medicine showman Chris Malley (Jack Carson) after he comes up with a perfect slogan: “The Royle Cigarette Company: Fit for a King.” Malley eventually becomes Royle's second in command.

Barton's invention produces cigarettes at a fraction of the cost of hand rolling, and Royle's company grows by leaps and bounds. “Sick of being treated like a lady” and aroused by the danger, Margaret leads Brant on. Brant comes hours late to Sonia's birthday party and tells her his plans, blind to the fact that she loves him. She goes to Europe.

One by one, Royle takes over the big businesses, until only Singleton is left. Finally, he shows the Major that he has acquired his shares and his debts. Royle offers to give them back as a wedding present. Margaret tells Singleton that she will marry Royle, even though she does not love him, in order to save the family interests. He is appalled at her cold-blooded practicality and, blaming Royle, challenges the upstart to a duel in the hotel bar. Royle refuses, even when Singleton threatens to shoot him in cold blood: That would violate Singleton's code of honor. Singleton does shoot, wounding the unarmed man slightly. Disgraced, he commits suicide.

Singleton's estate is worthless. Even Singleton House is mortgaged. Margaret refuses to sell the house: She will find a way. Royle comes to see her, to say that whatever hatred there was has gone with her father. She warns him to stay away from her. He replies that with him, she can have everything. They kiss.

Royle buys out Barton, who goes to Detroit and the fledgling automobile business. Sonia returns from Europe, to a house beautifully refurbished by Malley, who proposes. Sonia believes Brant and Margaret are through, now that the Major is dead. Malley shows her the betrothal announcement.

Margaret and Brant marry. Sonia's wedding gift is the pocketwatch. The Royles go abroad for a year. When they return, the business is in trouble and so is the marriage. Margaret refuses to share Royle's bed. Headlines read "Attorney General to Smash Royle Inc." over monopoly charges. Spending lavishly, Margaret has sold all the stock that Royle gave her. Malley says she has taken $2 million out of the company. Royle and Malley, who knew that Barton was behind the monopoly charges, learn that Margaret has been feeding Barton information. Brant confronts Margaret, who tells him she has schemed and planned to destroy him since the day her father was buried. Now she wants a divorce. Until the day he dies, Brant will remember the Singletons. She leaves; he sets the house on fire accidentally. He stops the fire brigade, crying “Let it burn!”

On New Year's Day, 1900, Brant comes to Sonia to say goodbye and to apologize. She says he has killed the Brant Royle she loved. As to the business, he says Malley will handle it; Royle tobacco is so big now, it doesn't need him. Riding out of town, he pauses to listen to his father's watch.

Cast
 Gary Cooper as Brant Royle
 Lauren Bacall as Sonia Kovac
 Patricia Neal as Margaret Jane Singleton
 Jack Carson as Chris Malley, aka "Dr Monaco"
 Donald Crisp as Major Singleton
 Gladys George as Rose, one of Sonia's prostitutes
 Elizabeth Patterson as Tabitha Singleton, Margaret's older relation and companion
 Jeff Corey as John Barton
 Taylor Holmes as Lawyer Calhoun
 Thurston Hall as Phillips, a tobacco grower
 Ralph Moody as Blacksmith (uncredited)
 Paul Newlan as Blacksmith (uncredited)
 Edward Peil Sr. as Train Conductor (uncredited)
 Cleo Moore as Louise (uncredited)

Reception

Box office
According to Warner Bros records, the film earned $1,702,000 domestically and $744,000 foreign.

Critical reaction
Bosley Crowther of The New York Times observed: "There is a great deal about the tobacco business and its history which is fascinating... the main fault of this drama, so far as flavor is concerned, is that it soon drifts away from the aura of the pungent tobacco industry and becomes just an old-fashioned conflict between a love-crazy man and a pitiless girl... The screen play by Ranald MacDougall, from Foster Fitz-Simons' book, is a literate piece of writing, with a couple of taut dramatic scenes, but virtually every twist in it can be seen a mile away." William Brogdon of Variety wrote "It's overlong and tedious at times in telling its drama of the tobacco industry, love and revenge during the last decade of the 19th century. Star names provide some boxoffice help, but there's not enough good solid interest in the footage to sustain it." Harrison's Reports similarly wrote: "Adult in dialogue and in treatment, the picture is overlong, plot-heavy and slow-paced, and its theme of love and revenge somewhat unpleasant. The performances are uniformly good, and there are a number of individual scenes that are outstanding, but there is so much plot and counterplot that, for the most part, the drama fails to come through on the screen with telling emotional impact."

Legacy 
The film, one of many epic melodramas produced by Hollywood at the time, was widely forgotten after its first theatrical release in 1950. Bright Leaf gained new attention in 2003, when it played prominently in the documentary Bright Leaves by filmmaker Ross McElwee, a descendant of the man whose life was reflected in both the novel and film.

Notes

References

External links 
 
 
 
 

1950 romantic drama films
1950 films
American black-and-white films
American romantic drama films
American Western (genre) films
1950 Western (genre) films
1950s English-language films
Films directed by Michael Curtiz
Films scored by Victor Young
Films set in North Carolina
Films with screenplays by Ranald MacDougall
Warner Bros. films
1950s American films